Never Gonna Be Another One is Thelma Houston's eleventh studio album, released in 1981. While the album did not make an impact on the pop charts, the album performed better in the urban and club/dance music markets. It includes the two major Hot Dance/Club Play chart hits, "If You Feel It" (#6) and "96 Tears" (#22) and 
"Never Give You Up" (#17). All three singles gained moderate radio play.

Track listing
All tracks composed by Gary Goetzman and Mike Piccirillo; except where indicated
 "Never Give You Up"
 "Too Many Teardrops"
 "96 Tears" (Rudy Martinez)
 "There's No Runnin' Away From"
 "Never Gonna Be Another One"
 "If You Feel It" (John William Scroggins, Ronald Brown)
 "Don't Make Me Over" (Burt Bacharach, Hal David)
 "Hollywood"

Personnel
Thelma Houston - lead vocals, backing vocals
Mike Piccirillo - guitar, synthesizer, percussion, backing vocals, associate producer
Keni Burke, Scott Edwards - bass guitar
Bill Cuomo - keyboards, synthesizer
Stewart Levine - keyboards
Ed Greene - drums
Gary Goetzman, Mark Wolfson - percussion
Joel Peskin - saxophone
Julia Tillman Waters, Maxine Willard Waters - backing vocals

1981 albums
Thelma Houston albums
RCA Records albums